Poonji is a Bollywood film. It was released in 1943. The film was directed by Ravindra Dave and Vishnu R. Pancholi. It starred M. Esmail, Durga Mota, Ragini in lead roles.

Plot
The film revolves around three sisters trying to prevent their father from remarrying.

Production
The film was a debut of directors Ravindra Dave and Vishnu R. Pancholi. The film was produced by Dalsukh M. Pancholi. The film starred M. Esmail, Durga Mota, Ragini in lead roles. The music was directed by Ghulam Haider.

Reception
The film was released in 1943 and declared commercially hit.

The Film India (December 1943) magazine noted, "A film that entertained and yet made a substantial contribution to the screen art of the country... The picture is directed by two new comers and considering that they were new to the game, they could be said to have done very well."

References

External links
 

1943 films
1940s Hindi-language films
Indian black-and-white films
Films directed by Ravindra Dave